Gacha may refer to:

 Gashapon, a kind of toy that originated in Japan which is sold inside a plastic capsule. Commonly sold in vending machines
Gacha game, video games that are monetized via a concept that is similar to gashapon. Comparable to Loot boxes
 Gācha, an administrative district in Bangladesh
 Gacha Gacha, a Japanese shōnen manga by Hiroyuki Tamakoshi which ran from 2002–2007
 Gatcha Gacha, a Japanese shōjo manga by Yutaka Tachibana which ran from 2001–2008
 José Gonzalo Rodríguez Gacha, a Colombian drug lord and co-founder of the Medellín Cartel
 Beya Gille Gacha (born 1990), French sculptor
 Gacha (Mongolian:ᠭᠠᠴᠠᠭ᠎ᠠ Gaqaa, Chinese: 嘎查 gacha), the smallest administrative unit in Inner Mongolia, same as a nomadic settlement or hamlet

See also
 Gotcha (disambiguation)